The 2011 Valle d'Aosta Open was a professional tennis tournament played on hard courts. It was the first edition of the tournament which was part of the 2011 ATP Challenger Tour. It took place in Courmayeur, Italy between 31 January – 6 February 2011.

ATP entrants

Seeds

 Rankings are as of January 17, 2011.

Other entrants
The following players received wildcards into the singles main draw:
  Claudio Grassi
  Tommaso Metti
  Luca Vanni
  Matthieu Vierin

The following players received special entrants into the singles main draw:
  Alexander Sadecky
  Nicolas Renavand

The following players received entry from the qualifying draw:
  Laurynas Grigelis
  Gianluca Naso
  Clément Reix
  Élie Rousset

The following players received entry as a lucky loser into the singles main draw:
  Andrea Stoppini

Champions

Singles

 Nicolas Mahut def.  Gilles Müller, 7–6(4), 6–4

Doubles

 Marc Gicquel /  Nicolas Mahut def.  Olivier Charroin /  Alexandre Renard, 6–3, 6–4

External links
Official Website
ITF Search
ATP official site

Valle d'Aosta Open
Hard court tennis tournaments
Tennis tournaments in Italy
Sport in Courmayeur